Araya Indra, known by the stage name Art Arya, is a Thai drag performer, designer, and stylist. She hosts Drag Race Thailand alongside Pangina Heals. She has worked in the fashion industry for three decades and has appeared on two seasons of The Face Thailand. She has been described as one of Thailand's most famous drag queens.

Career
Art Arya studied art and fashion design in Bangkok and France. She has worked with Lanvin and serves as the creative director of the Thai label THEATRE, as of 2018.

Filmography

Television
 Drag Race Thailand

References

Living people
Drag Race Thailand
Thai designers
Thai drag queens
Year of birth missing (living people)